Morné van den Berg (born 24 October 1997) is a South African rugby union player for the  in Super Rugby and the  in the Rugby Challenge. His regular position is fullback or scrum-half.

References

South African rugby union players
Living people
1997 births
Rugby union players from Johannesburg
Rugby union fullbacks
Golden Lions players
Lions (United Rugby Championship) players
Rugby union scrum-halves